Jinnah's Birthday, officially Quaid-e-Azam Day and sometimes known as Quaid Day, is a public holiday in Pakistan observed annually on 25 December to celebrate the birthday of the founder of Pakistan, Muhammad Ali Jinnah, known as Quaid-i-Azam ("Great Leader"). A major holiday, commemorations for Jinnah began during his lifetime in 1942, and have continued ever since. The event is primarily observed by the government and the citizens of the country where the national flag is hoisted at major architect structures such as private and public buildings, particularly at the top of Quaid-e-Azam House in Karachi.

History 

Muhammad Ali Jinnah (1876–1948) was the founder and first governor-general of Pakistan. He is among the most revered leaders in the country's history, and often referred to as Qaid-e-Azam, meaning "Great Leader". In 1942, numerous events commemorated Jinnah on his birthday, 25 December: the All-India Muslim League organised a fund for the poor and Liaquat Ali Khan held a reception for the leader. At the Wellington Pavilion in Delhi, Muslim citizens also held a reception for Jinnah. From then on, numerous events were held yearly on 25 December in honour Jinnah during his lifetime; this included receptions, parades, commemorations, speeches and recognition from other world leaders.

Observance and traditions
A major holiday in Pakistan, it is celebrated conventionally across the country. Since 25 December is celebrated as Christmas Day, Pakistani citizens observe both holidays on 25 December.

The unified ritualistic event, usually attended by prominent leaders, military commanders and citizens, is organised at Mazar-e-Quaid, and while it is aimed at to highlight the life of Jinnah, all public and private sectors, including schools, colleges and universities remain closed to organise multiple events such as debates, seminars and exhibitions at respective locations without being involved in office management.

Security arrangements 
The event's security arrangements are handled by the Pakistan Army. This is also assigned to the Pakistan Air Force. A guard mounting is also held in the country to perform ceremonial guard duties on Jinnah's Day.

See also 
 List of things named after Muhammad Ali Jinnah
 Public holidays in Pakistan

Citations

General sources 
 

Birthdays of heads of state
December observances
Muhammad Ali Jinnah
Public holidays in Pakistan